Luzzat-un-Nissa Begum (23 September 1597 – ) was a Mughal princess, the youngest daughter of Emperor Jahangir and his Rathore wife, Jagat Gosain.
She was also the full sister of Emperor Shah Jahan.

Life 
Born on 23 September 1597, Luzzat was the youngest daughter of Prince Salim (later Jahangir), the eldest surviving son of Mughal Emperor Akbar. Her mother was the Rathore princess, Jagat Gosain (Bilqis Makani in official chronicles), the tenth daughter of Udai Singh Rathore, the Raja of Marwar. She was born at Kashmir on the return journey of the Royal entourage of her grandfather, Akbar, towards Lahore.

She had two older full-siblings, Begum Sultan, who died infancy and Prince Khurram, who succeeded their father to throne.

Death 
Luzzat-un-Nissa died at the age of 5, during the rebellion of her father.

Ancestry

References 

1597 births
1603 deaths
Mughal princesses
16th-century Indian women
17th-century Indian women
Daughters of emperors
Royalty and nobility who died as children